William Denman Eberle (June 5, 1923April 3, 2008) was an American politician and businessman from Idaho who held the office of Trade Representative from 1971 to 1974 under Presidents Richard Nixon and Gerald Ford.

Biography
Eberle was born in Boise, Idaho. He attended Boise High School, Stanford University and Harvard Law School. Eberle married the former Jean C. Quick and they had four children: Jeffrey, W. David, Francis Q. and Cilista C. Eberle.

Eberle was a co-founder of pulp and paper company Boise Cascade and was chief executive officer of manufacturing firm American Standard. From 1953 to 1961, he was a member of the Idaho House of Representatives.

Eberle served as Trade Representative during the Nixon and Ford administrations, from 1971 to 1974. During his time as chief trade negotiator, he pushed Europe and Japan to lower trade barriers. He also pressed trading partners to give American farmers and businesses more access to overseas markets.  He resigned and was succeeded by Frederick B. Dent, who resigned as Commerce Secretary.

Eberle died of renal failure in Concord, Massachusetts on April 3, 2008.

References

Council of American Ambassadors: William D. Eberle
List of United States Trade Representatives
New York Times - Obituary

1923 births
2008 deaths
20th-century American politicians
American chief executives
Deaths from kidney failure
Harvard Law School alumni
Members of the Idaho House of Representatives
Stanford University alumni
United States Trade Representatives